École secondaire catholique de la Vérendrye (ESCDLV) is a French Catholic high school located in Port Arthur, Thunder Bay, Ontario. It is part of the Conseil scolaire de district catholique des Aurores boréales, a French Catholic school board serving Northwestern Ontario. The school opened in 2004 on the site of the former Prospect Avenue Public School. The construction of the French language high school faced opposition from Thunder Bay's Anglophone majority. The school is named after Pierre Gaultier de Varennes, sieur de La Vérendrye, a French explorer. La Vérendrye has a high graduation rate, and its enrolment has increased annually since it opened, and the building will be expanded in the near future. There is a total of 37 employees at La Vérendrye as of January 2009 (excluding school board).

Sports
La Vérendrye has the best athlete/student ratio for high schools in Thunder Bay. The school is known for volleyball, having won 6 championships and 5 tournaments since 2004, and for the first time on November 21, 2008, the senior boys' volleyball team beat Atikokan in the NWOSSAA "A" championships, bringing them into provincials (OFSAA) where they finished 12th in Ontario for "A". Teams from La Vérendrye also participate in golf, curling, basketball and running. Due to a lack of students, la Vérendrye could not have Basketball or senior girls' volleyball teams for the 08-09 SSSAA season.

See also
List of high schools in Ontario
Education in Thunder Bay, Ontario

External links
 Official site 

Verendrye
Verendrye
Educational institutions established in 2004
2004 establishments in Ontario